Heavy Winged is an American drone metal trio from Brooklyn, New York. Their sound has been compared to Boris, Dead C and Bardo Pond. Their music has been released by Three Lobed Recordings, Type Records and Deep Water Acres.

Partial discography

 Heavy Winged / Taiga Remains - Split (2006)	
 Taking The Veil (2006)	
 Echoes Of Silence (2006)
 Hunting The Moon (2006)
 A Serpent's Lust (2006)	
 Heavy Winged / Taiga Remains - Heavy Winged / Taiga Remains - Split (2007)	
 Ashtray Navigations / Cold Solemn Rites In The Sun / Heavy Winged - Split (2007)	
 Feel Inside (2007)	
 We Grow (2007)	
 Alive In My Mouth (2008)
 Windy & Carl / Heavy Winged - Split (2008)	
 The Thinner The Air (2009)	
 Heavy Winged + Inca Ore - Ring Mining (2009)
 Waking, Shaking (2009)	
 Spreading Center (2009)	
 Sunspotted (2010)
 Fields Within Fields (2010)

References

Musical groups established in 2004
Rock music groups from New York (state)